Alexandra Sergeyevna Albedinskaya (30 November 1834 – 12 September 1913) was a Russian noble and courtier.

Alexandra Albedinskaya was the royal mistress of Tsar Alexander II of Russia  from the early 1850s until 1862.

Biography 
Alexandra Albedinskaya was born to chamberlain Prince Sergei Alekseevich Dolgorukov and Maria Alexandrovna, nee Countess Apraksina.

Alexandra Albedinskaya was a descendant of a member of the Supreme Privy Council of Prince Alexei Grigoryevich Dolgorukov. The latter married one of his daughters, Princess Catherine, the Russian Emperor Peter II. Alexandra Sergeevna was a distant relative of Princess Ekaterina Mikhailovna Dolgorukova (1847–1922) (she was the fourth cousin of Mikhail Mikhailovich, father of the future Princess Yuryevskaya). Albedinskaya had four brothers ( Nikolai, Alexander, Alexei, Dmitry) and four sisters (Anna, Margarita, Varvara, Maria).

Alexandra Albedinskaya was baptised on 20 November 1834 in the Court Cathedral in the Winter Palace under the perception of Empress Alexandra Feodorovna and Grand Duke Alexander Nikolaevich (the future Alexander II).

Maid of honour 
In 1853, Alexandra Albedinskaya was appointed a maid of honour to the court of Empress Maria Alexandrovna. She was appointed in order to “save her from home oppression”. According to Anna Tyutcheva, she initially had friendly relations with Alexandra Albedinskaya, but then “instinctively felt in her whole being some kind of isolation, which made me restrained as well.”

References 

1834 births
1913 deaths
Ladies-in-waiting from the Russian Empire
Mistresses of Russian royalty
Place of birth missing